Oscillation is the seventh and final studio album by the Norwegian black / gothic metal band Trail of Tears. It was released on
April 26, 2013 under Massacre Records. The album was recorded at Sound Suite Studio in Marseille, France, between September and October 2011, in collaboration with producer Terje Refsnes.

Bjørn Dugstad Rønnow is listed as the band's drummer in the booklet, however, guitarist Bjørn Erik Næss is credited with having performed the drums on this album.

Background 
Oscillation was composed and recorded  in 2011, during a difficult time for the band, with strong personal differences of Ronny Thorsen with Cathrine Paulsen and the guitarist Bjørn Erik Næss, when these had a partner relationship. Consequently, Thorsen took a more secondary role than usual in this album, while Paulsen was involved in virtually all possible areas of production. The album had significant delays in its release date, after recording between September and October of that year. An additional problem was the expiration of Trail of Tears contract with Napalm Records, extended in  late 2007.

In January 2012, Trail of Tears announced that long-time drummer Cato Jensen has parted ways with the band. Bjørn Dugstad Rønnow later joined the band as the new drummer.  In fact, none of them participated in the recording sessions made little more than two months earlier in Marseille (Næss was the uncredited session drummer). However, Rønnow was included in the album credits and appeared in all the illustrative photos.

On 11 November 2012, the band revealed the cover artwork, made by  Finnish artist Jan Yrlund. The striking cover features a rusty steamship aground on a beach. The concept (with the frozen landscape in grayscale) seem reminiscent of  Rammstein's Rosenrot (2005). In preparation for the release of Oscillation, the band signed to Massacre Records.

In January 2013, Ronny Thorsen, Endre Moe, and Bjørn Dugstad Rønnow were announced to have left Trail of Tears. Thorsen has been reported as leaving the band, despite being the only constant member of Trail of Tears since its inception. The remaining members were initially reported to be Cathrine Paulsen and Bjørn Erik Næss; both parties split from one another on acrimonious grounds. According to Thorsen's Facebook statements, Massacre Records gave full support to himself, Moe, and Rønnow, while Oscillation  is the final Trail of Tears album.

Releases 

After long and torturous recording, the album was finally released in Europe on 26 April 2013, almost a year and a half after it was recorded, and with the band already dissolved. In North America, Oscillation was released until 11 June.

The limited edition on digipak includes two bonus tracks: "Sleep Forever" and "Quick Fix of Shame".

About the album title, Thorsen said: "The word oscillation has a wide range of interpretation. For us, we wanted to play around the meaning of duality, balance and contrasts".

Track listing

Personnel

Trail of Tears
 Ronny Thorsen – vocals
 Cathrine Paulsen − soprano
 Bjørn Erik Næss − guitar, drums
 Endre Moe − bass guitar

Additional musicians
Audun Grønnestad - additional orchestration, synths and programming

Production
Terje Refsnes - producer, engineer, mixing
Audun Grønnestad - co-producer
Mika Jussila - mastering at Finnvox Studios, Finland, December 2012 
 Jan "Örkki" Yrlund - cover  art, design, layout, photography 
 Cathrine Paulsen - design concept [cover concept], typography [Handwritten Lyrics]
Audun Grønnestad, Bjørn Erik Næss, Cathrine Paulsen - mixing
Mixed At – Mayhem Music Studio in Kristiansand, Norway in 2012

References

External links 
Oscillation Photoshoot
 Oscillation st Discogs
 Metallum Archives
 Oscillation at Metal underground

2013 albums
Trail of Tears (band) albums
Massacre Records albums